The European Payments Initiative (EPI), previously known as the Pan-European Payments System Initiative (PEPSI), is a European Central Bank-backed payment-integration initiative aiming to create a pan-European payment system and interbank network to rival Mastercard and Visa, and eventually replace national European payment schemes such as France's Carte Bancaire and Germany's Girocard.

It is supported by the European Commission, and currently comprises twenty major European banks (including all the major French banks, Deutsche Bank and Commerzbank in Germany, Santander Bank in Spain and Intesa Sanpaolo and UniCredit in Italy).

First attempt 

The idea of introducing a pan-European card scheme within the Single Euro Payments Area was born around 2008. In 2010, major European banks from more than ten countries met at the "Madrid Symposium" to discuss the initiative and make plans to take it forward. By 2011, the Monnet Project had developed detailed technical and business plans for the merger of national payment schemes. By then, it included 24 banks drawn from seven countries. However, the proponents of the new system did not believe they could develop a viable business model that did not include commercially viable interchange fees for the participating banks, a concern they raised with the European Commission. The commission was unwilling to allow any movement that could erode free competition, and therefore refused to endorse any system, even a new entrant, with interchange fees that exceeded the low level that the commission was seeking.

Commercial interests prevailing over a pan-European solution, and in the absence of a clear source of income for the issuing banks, progress on the project was put to a halt. It was dissolved in April 2012 due to "the perceived absence of a viable business model", according to the European Central Bank.

Partnerships 
Visa Europe, the only payment system that broadly met the definition of a European card scheme, was acquired by Visa Inc. in June 2016.

In July 2020, a group of 16 major European banks from five countries (Belgium, France, Germany, the Netherlands and Spain) announced their support and development programs for the European Payments Initiative (EPI). These banks include: BBVA, BNP Paribas, Groupe BPCE, CaixaBank, Commerzbank, Crédit Agricole, Crédit Mutuel, Deutsche Bank, Deutscher Sparkassen- und Giroverband, DZ Bank, ING, KBC Group, La Banque Postale, Banco Santander, Société Générale and UniCredit. In 2021 more than 30 banks were member, including Bancontact/Payconiq. In mid-2020 it was expected that the first real-world applications - a system for real-time payments between consumers - could be launched in early 2022, with a broader payments tool to follow in the second half of 2022.

Infrastructure 
As it is based on the SEPA instant credit transfer (SCT Inst) scheme, EPI's payment network can immediately capitalise on powerful and sophisticated existing infrastructures, such as the Eurosystem's TARGET Instant Payment Settlement (TIPS). The EPI will have a payment network and card, a wallet, and an international instant payments scheme as a replacement for domestic solutions such as Swish, iDEAL, Bizum and Blik. NFC payments and QR code payment will be made available. The solution will be available through mobile banking integration, but also as a standalone app, and will contain currency conversion throughout the whole of Europe. The first country where this will be implemented is Poland.

Nordic countries 
Denmark, Sweden and Finland have been developing their own common payment system called P27 since 2017, with the intent to harmonise electronic payments across the nordic countries. Discussion have been happening with EPI on how to collaborate.

References

See also 
 Euro Alliance of Payment Schemes, a previous failed European attempt to unify European payment systems

Banking in Europe
Banking in the European Union
Credit card issuer associations
Debit card issuer associations
European Economic Area
Eurozone
Financial services in Europe
Interbank networks
Payment systems